Masdevallia mejiana is a species of orchid endemic to Colombia.

References

External links 

mejiana
Endemic orchids of Colombia